Notiophanes is a genus of moths in the family Arrhenophanidae, consisting of only one species Notiophanes fuscata, which is endemic to Queensland, Australia. It is only known from a single female specimen.

The generic name is derived from the Greek notios (meaning southern), added to the generic stem phanes (from phaino, meaning shine or appear), in reference to its Australian distribution.

The length of the forewing is about 27 mm. Adults are on wing in February, but this may be a longer period.

External links
Family Arrhenophanidae

Arrhenophanidae
Moths described in 2003